Agios Konstantinos is a village in the Limassol District of Cyprus, located 7 km east of Kalo Chorio.

References

Communities in Limassol District